The Slovak National Badminton Championships is a tournament organized to crown the best badminton players in Slovakia.

The tournament started in 1993 and is held every year.

Past winners

References
Details of affiliated national organisations at Badminton Europe

Badminton tournaments in Slovakia
National badminton championships
Recurring sporting events established in 1993
Sports competitions in Slovakia
1993 establishments in Slovakia